Judge Steel may refer to:

Edwin DeHaven Steel Jr. (1904–1986), judge of the United States District Court for the District of Delaware
William H. Steele (judge) (born 1951), judge of the United States District Court for the Southern District of Alabama

See also
John E. Steele (born 1949), judge of the United States District Court for the Middle District of Florida
Justice Steele (disambiguation)